Mayan-e Vosta (also Romanized as Māyān-e Vosţá) is a village in Torqabeh Rural District, Torqabeh District, Torqabeh and Shandiz County, Razavi Khorasan Province, Iran. At the 2016 census, its population was 325, in 85 families.

References 

Populated places in Torqabeh and Shandiz County